Vasile Marchiş (born 22 February 1972 in Bistra, Maramureș, Romania) is a former Romanian football player. He is the only Romanian footballer to have won the Finnish championship.

Early life
Vasile Marchiş was born and raised in Bistra, Maramureș, a small village near the border between Romania and Ukraine.

When Marchiş was 14 years old, a Greco-Roman wrestling trainer from Sighetu Marmaţiei, a town where Vasile was attending the high school, noticed him and took him to the gym. Despite performing very well as a wrestler, his childhood dream was to play professional football.

After three years, Marchiş went to a football trial at Mecanica, a team from Sighetu Marmaţiei. He was accepted, but his wrestling trainer refused Vasile's request and did not let him to the football pitch. After a talk between the two trainers, Marchiş begun his footballing career.

Career

Youth
After playing for Mecanica, Vasile moved to another Sighet-based football club, CIL. When he was playing for this team, Vasile went at a trial organized by the Liga I side Gloria Bistriţa, but was not accepted.

Senior
In Romania, Vasile Marchiş played only for lower league clubs, such as Astral, a football team from Deta, Timiș County. The club was dissolved in 1996, and Marchiş moved to Minerul Moldova Nouă, where he spend three seasons. Minerul was the last club where Vasile played in Romania.

In 1999, Ionel Bandu, his coach, asked him if he wants to go at a trial in Finland, organized by the Veikkausliiga club TPV Tampere, a new-promoted club in the first tier of the Finnish football. He went to the trial, and was immediately remarked by the manager of Nokian Pyry, a team which was playing in the second tier, Ykkonen. He accepted the offer and signed a contract with the Finnish club.

After a year at Nokia, Marchiş moved to another Ykkonen club, Pallo-Iirot, where he played for two years and scored his first league goal in Finland. In 2002, FC Jazz Pori, a team which was playing in the Veikkausliiga, made an offer for the Romanian and he made his debut in the first tier.

After only a year, Marchiş was bought by one of the finest teams of the moment in Finland, Tampere United, playing a season in the blue shirt before returning to FC Jazz. After another season, as a result of financial difficulties, the club was dissolved, and Marchiş made his return to Tampere United.

In 2006, Vasile Marchiş won the Finnish championship, Veikkausliiga, with Tampere United. It was his last season in United's shirt, before signing for the former champions of Finland Myllykosken Pallo. It was the last top-flight team for Marchiş, who returned at the third-tier club Pallo-Iirot after six seasons of Veikkausliiga.

In the summer of 2009, he was loaned at Porin Palloilijat, where he played only two league matches before returning to the Rauma-based club.

Achievements
 Veikkausliiga : 2006

Personal
His adoptive son, Andrei Marchiş, is playing for Liga II side FCM Bacău, and he previously played for clubs like CFR Timișoara, Juventus București or Pallo-Iirot.

References
An interview with Vasile Marchiş (Romanian)

1972 births
Living people
People from Maramureș County
Romanian footballers
Romanian expatriate footballers
Association football defenders
Expatriate footballers in Finland
Veikkausliiga players
FC Jazz players
Tampere United players
Myllykosken Pallo −47 players